The 2004 Rio de Janeiro motorcycle Grand Prix was the seventh round of the 2004 MotoGP Championship. It took place on the weekend of 2–4 July 2004 at Autódromo Internacional Nelson Piquet.

MotoGP classification

250 cc classification

125 cc classification

Championship standings after the race (motoGP)

Below are the standings for the top five riders and constructors after round seven has concluded.

Riders' Championship standings

Constructors' Championship standings

 Note: Only the top five positions are included for both sets of standings.

References

Rio de Janeiro motorcycle Grand Prix
Rio de Janeiro
Rio de Janeiro Motorcycle Grand Prix